The 1988 NCAA Division I Men's Basketball Championship Game was the final round of the 1988 NCAA Division I men's basketball tournament and determined the national champion for the 1987–88 NCAA Division I men's basketball season  The 1988 National Title Game was played on April 4, 1988 at Kemper Arena in Kansas City, Missouri. The 1988 National Title Game was played between the 1988 Southeast Regional Champions, #1-seeded Oklahoma and the 1988 Midwest Regional Champions, #6-seeded Kansas, both from the Big Eight Conference. The game remains, as of the 2022 Championship game, the last time two teams from the same conference played for the National Championship. Kansas's upset of Oklahoma was the third-biggest point-spread upset in the national title game in NCAA Tournament history. After the win, the 1988 Kansas team was remembered as "Danny and the Miracles" due to Danny Manning's excellence throughout the tournament, including a double-double in the national championship game with 31 points and 18 rebounds.

Participating teams

Kansas

Danny Manning, a senior forward, was named the Big Eight Conference Men's Basketball Player of the Year for the third consecutive season.

Midwest
Kansas (6) 85, Xavier (11) 72
Kansas 61, Murray State (14) 58
Kansas 77, Vanderbilt (7) 64
Kansas 71, Kansas State (4) 58
Final Four
Kansas 66, Duke (2) 59

Oklahoma

Southeast
 Oklahoma (1) 94, Chattanooga (16) 66
 Oklahoma 107, Auburn (8) 87
Oklahoma 108, Louisville (5) 98
Oklahoma 78, Villanova (6) 59
Final Four
Oklahoma 86, Arizona (1) 78

Starting lineups

Game summary
Source:

References

NCAA Division I Men's Basketball Championship Game
NCAA Division I Men's Basketball Championship Games
Kansas Jayhawks men's basketball
Oklahoma Sooners men's basketball
College sports tournaments in Missouri
Basketball competitions in Kansas City, Missouri
NCAA Division I Men's Basketball Championship Game
NCAA Division I Basketball Championship Game, 1988
NCAA Division I Basketball Championship Game